Las Vegas Mercury was an alternative newspaper published in Las Vegas, Nevada from January 4, 2001 to March 15, 2005.  The paper folded when Stephens Media purchased Las Vegas CityLife and combined the two newspapers.

Columnists 
 James Barrier
 George Knapp (journalist)
 Chip Mosher
 Pj Perez
 James P. Reza ("Go: What to Do, Where to Go, & Why")

References 

Newspapers published in Las Vegas
Publications established in 2003